"Rinconete y Cortadillo" (or "Novela de Rinconete y Cortadillo") is one of the twelve short stories included in Novelas Ejemplares, by Spanish writer Miguel de Cervantes.

The story is set in Seville in 1569, which at the time was a rich city with marked social contrasts, being the entrepôt of Spain and the new world of the Americas.

References

External links

1613 short stories
Short stories by Miguel de Cervantes